Hayes County is a county in the U.S. state of Nebraska. As of the 2010 United States Census, the population was 967. Its county seat is Hayes Center. The county was created in 1877, and was organized in 1884. It was named for Rutherford B. Hayes, the US President at the time of the county's creation.

In the Nebraska license plate system, Hayes County is represented by the prefix 79 (it had the seventy-ninth-largest number of vehicles registered in the county when the license plate system was established in 1922).

Geography
The terrain of Hayes County is hilly. The flattened hilltops are largely used for center pivot irrigation. Small creeks and streams drain the upper elevations; the largest is Red Willow Creek, which drains to Hugh Butler Lake just east of the SE corner of Hayes County, in Frontier County.

Major highways
  U.S. Highway 6
  Nebraska Highway 25
  Nebraska Highway 25A

Adjacent counties
 Frontier County – east
 Hitchcock County – south
 Dundy County – southwest
 Chase County – west
 Perkins County – northwest
 Lincoln County – north

Demographics

As of the 2000 United States Census, there were 1,068 people, 430 households, and 312 families in the county. The population density was 2 people per square mile (1/km2). There were 526 housing units at an average density of 0.7 per square mile (0.3/km2). The racial makeup of the county was 97.19% White, 0.19% Black or African American, 0.28% Asian, 1.78% from other races, and 0.56% from two or more races. 2.53% of the population were Hispanic or Latino of any race.

There were 430 households, out of which 28.10% had children under the age of 18 living with them, 67.00% were married couples living together, 2.60% had a female householder with no husband present, and 27.40% were non-families. 26.50% of all households were made up of individuals, and 15.60% had someone living alone who was 65 years of age or older. The average household size was 2.48 and the average family size was 3.02.

The county population contains 26.60% under the age of 18, 5.50% from 18 to 24, 21.50% from 25 to 44, 26.50% from 45 to 64, and 19.90% who were 65 years of age or older. The median age was 42 years. For every 100 females there were 100.40 males. For every 100 females age 18 and over, there were 102.60 males.

The median income for a household in the county was $26,667, and the median income for a family was $31,125. Males had a median income of $19,211 versus $16,806 for females. The per capita income for the county was $14,099. About 14.60% of families and 18.40% of the population were below the poverty line, including 26.20% of those under age 18 and 12.90% of those age 65 or over.

Communities

Villages 
 Hamlet
 Hayes Center (county seat)
 Palisade (partial)

Unincorporated community 

 Marengo

Townships
Hayes County has not been subdivided into townships, unlike most other Nebraska counties.

Former communities

 Carrico
 Eddy
 Elmer
 Estel
 Galena
 Highland
 Hope
 Hudson
 Marengo
 Norris
 Robert
 Strickland
 Sullivan
 Thornburgh
 White

Politics
Hayes County voters have traditionally been strongly Republican. In no national election since 1936 has the county selected the Democratic Party candidate. In 2020 Donald Trump received 92% of the vote, one of the highest margins by far.

See also
 National Register of Historic Places listings in Hayes County, Nebraska

References

 
Nebraska counties
1884 establishments in Nebraska
Populated places established in 1884